Mr. Jones may refer to:

Music 
 Mr. Jones (Tom Jones album), 2002
 Mr. Jones (Elvin Jones album), 1972
 "Mr. Jones" (Counting Crows song), 1993
 "Mr. Jones" (Mike Jones song), 2006
 "Mr. Jones" (Pop Smoke song), 2021
 "Mr. Jones", a song by Incognito from Adventures In Black Sunshine (2004)
 "Mr. Jones", a song by The Mavericks from From Hell to Paradise, 1992
 "Mr. Jones", a song by NOFX from Liberal Animation, 1988
 "Mr. Jones", a song by The Psychedelic Furs from Talk Talk Talk, 1981
 "Mr. Jones", a song by Talking Heads from Naked, 1988
 "Mr. Jones", a song by country artist Big Al Downing, 1978
 Mr. Jones, a character in Bob Dylan's song "Ballad of a Thin Man", 1965
 Mr. Jones, a character in the Bee Gees' song "New York Mining Disaster 1941", 1967

Other media 
 Mr. Jones (1993 film), a drama starring Richard Gere, Lena Olin and Anne Bancroft
 Mr. Jones (2013 film), a horror thriller film by Karl Mueller
 Mr Jones (2019 film), a biographical thriller film directed by Agnieszka Holland
 Mr. Jones, a fictional character in the James Bond film Dr. No
 Mr. Jones, a fictional character in George Orwell's novel Animal Farm
 Mr. Jones, a fictional character in the video game Rage of the Dragons
 Mr. Jones, a fictional character in Zig and Zag.

See also
Jones (surname), a popular family name of British origins
 Jones (disambiguation)
 Mrs. Jones (disambiguation)
"Hey Mr. Jones", a song by Jane Child from Jane Child